Portrait of Marcel Duchamp is a circa 1920–1922 work of art by Baroness Elsa von Freytag-Loringhoven.  It is an example of assemblage, made of an amalgamation of broken wine glasses, assorted feathers, tree twigs, and other unidentifiable objects in reference to Marcel Duchamp, who created various ready-mades beginning in 1913.

References

External links
Photograph of Portrait of Marcel Duchamp - Francis M. Naumann Fine Art
Tomkins, Calvin: Duchamp: A Biography, Henry Holt and Company, Inc., 1996. 

1920 sculptures
Duchamp
Duchamp